Fanie Lombaard (also spelled Lombard; born 29 May 1969) is an athlete and Paralympian from South Africa competing in P42 pentathlon and F42 throwing events.	
	
He competed in the 2000 Summer Paralympics in Sydney, Australia.  There he won a gold medal in the men's Pentathlon - P42 event, a gold medal in the men's Discus throw - F42 event, a gold medal in the men's Shot put - F42 event and a silver medal in the men's Javelin throw - F42 event.  He also competed at the 2004 Summer Paralympics in Athens, Greece.    There he won a gold medal in the men's Discus throw - F42 event, a gold medal in the men's Shot put - F42 event and a silver medal in the men's Javelin throw - F42 event. He competed in the 2008 Summer Paralympics in Beijing, People's Republic of China where he won a bronze medal in the F42 shot put and a gold medal in the F42 discus throw.

Lombaard is world record holder in F42 discus and P42 pentathlon events.

In 2011 Lombaard was suspended for 1 year after he failed a drug test for probenecid doping.

References

External links
 

1969 births
Living people
South African male discus throwers
South African male shot putters
South African people of Dutch descent
Paralympic athletes of South Africa
Paralympic gold medalists for South Africa
Paralympic silver medalists for South Africa
Paralympic bronze medalists for South Africa
Athletes (track and field) at the 2000 Summer Paralympics
Athletes (track and field) at the 2004 Summer Paralympics
Athletes (track and field) at the 2008 Summer Paralympics
Medalists at the 2000 Summer Paralympics
Medalists at the 2004 Summer Paralympics
Medalists at the 2008 Summer Paralympics
White South African people
World record holders in Paralympic athletics
Doping cases in athletics
Paralympic medalists in athletics (track and field)
20th-century South African people
21st-century South African people
Discus throwers with limb difference
Shot putters with limb difference
Paralympic discus throwers
Paralympic shot putters